Christmas at Maxwell's is a 2006 American independent drama film written and directed by William C. Laufer, and starring Andrew May and Jacqueline 'Jack' Hourigan.

Plot
Suzie Austin (Jack Hourigan) has cancer and her most recent prognosis is unfavorable.  Fearing that this may be their last Christmas together, husband Andrew Austin (Andrew May) takes Suzie and their two children, Chris (Charlie May) and Mary (Julia May) to the family's summer home on Lake Erie to celebrate the holiday.  There they meet Gus (Angus May). Andrew comes to terms with his past as the family deals with his wife's failing health.

Background
The film is based upon Laufer's real-life experiences and was shot on locations in Ohio. Laufer's daughter, Tiffany Laufer, an American Film Institute Alumna, served as cinematographer and co-producer.  An advance screening was held on November 28, 2006, with all ticket proceeds going to the American Cancer Society.  The film had its official theatrical release on December 1, 2006, and its television debut on Christmas Day.

Partial cast
 Andrew May as Andrew Austin 
 Jack Hourigan as Suzie Austin 
 Helen Welch as Rachel Henderson 
 Rick Montgomery Jr. as Dr. Callahan 
 Tracie Field as Tootsie 
 Robert Hawkes as Col. Pickerling 
 Angus May as Uncle Gus 
 Charlie May as Chris Austin 
 Julia May as Mary Austin
 William C. Laufer as Fr. Johnston

Reception
Belinda Elliott of CBN wrote that even with its low budget, the film was "beautifully photographed with rich warming images of Christmas", but cautioned that themes of illness and death might be too heavy for young children.  She summarized that the film was a "heartwarming holiday tale that lovingly illustrates the power of faith and the fact that miracles can and do still happen."  East Valley Living reports that the film had received an award from the Dove Foundation.

In 2010 Trinity Broadcasting Network (TBN) picked up the movie for a worldwide TV release.

See also
 List of Christmas films

References

External links
 
 Christmas At Maxwells at Rotten Tomatoes
 Official Website
 Lauferfilm.com Production website

2006 films
American Christmas drama films
2000s Christmas drama films
2006 drama films
2000s English-language films
2000s American films